Thorsten Frei (born 8 August 1973) is a German lawyer and politician of the Christian Democratic Union (CDU) who has been serving as a member of the Bundestag from the state of Baden-Württemberg since 2013.

Political career 
Frei first became a member of the Bundestag in the 2013 German federal election. From 2013 until 2017, he was a member of the Committee on European Affairs, the Committee on Foreign Affairs and its Subcommittee on Civilian Crisis Prevention. 

Since 2018, Frei has been serving as deputy chairman of the CDU/CSU parliamentary group, under the leadership of chairman Ralph Brinkhaus. In this capacity, he coordinates the group's legislative activities on consumer protection, domestic affairs, sports, and minorities. 

In addition to his committee assignments, Frei chairs the German-Swiss Parliamentary Friendship Group.

Other activities 
 Center for International Peace Operations (ZIF), Member of the Supervisory Board (2018-2019)
 Federal Agency for Civic Education (BPB), Member of the Board of Trustees

References

External links 

  
 Bundestag biography 

1973 births
Living people
Members of the Bundestag for Baden-Württemberg
Members of the Bundestag 2021–2025
Members of the Bundestag 2017–2021
Members of the Bundestag 2013–2017
Members of the Bundestag for the Christian Democratic Union of Germany